The SD45T-2 is a model of diesel-electric locomotive built by EMD for the Southern Pacific Railroad. Like the later SD40T-2 it is colloquially nicknamed a tunnel motor. 247 total units (including the original EMD/SP joint venture working Prototype) were produced from February 1972 to June 1975, including 84 for SP's subsidiary Cotton Belt. From April 1986 to December 1989, 126 were rebuilt and re-designated as SD45T-2R, including 24 for Cotton Belt.

The SD45T-2 is a variant of the venerable SD45 that featured the "Dash 2" upgrade components such as improved electronics and high traction trucks, with the "T" denoting its cooling system modifications. The intake for radiator cooling air was moved to the walkway level and the cooling fans themselves were under the radiator cores, instead of above. Tunnel motors were built for mountainous areas in the western United States, where SP had previously encountered repeated overheating issues on their SD45s.

The later SD40T-2 looks similar to the SD45T-2. One spotting difference is the longer hood on the SD45T-2 to accommodate the V20 prime mover vs. the V16 used on the SD40T-2. The SD45T-2's cab is further forward on the frame, so there is less "front porch". This mimics the differences between the SD45-2 and the SD40-2. Another spotting difference is the SD45T-2's three fan access doors on each side above the cooling air intake, while the SD40T-2 has two. 

Like their SD40T-2, some of SP's SD45T-2 tunnel motors were obtained by Kansas City Southern Railway, Bessemer and Lake Erie Railroad, Duluth, Missabe and Iron Range Railway, and by the Union Pacific Railroad when it merged the SP in 1996.

Some SD45T-2s were rebuilt and designated to SD45T-3, SD40T-3 and SD40-2T. In addition, some locomotive leasing companies own the SD45 tunnel motor locomotives. They are scattered all over the United States and are an increasingly rare sight.

Original owners

Preservation 
Southern Pacific 6819 (originally 9193) was donated by SP successor Union Pacific Railroad to the California State Railroad Museum in December 2001.

References

 Sarberenyi, Robert. EMD SD45T-2 Original Owners. Retrieved on August 27, 2006
 American-Rails.com . Added May 19, 2018
 Richard Percy. ESPEE MODELERS ARCHIVE . Added May 19, 2018

External links 
 

C-C locomotives
SD45T-2
Diesel-electric locomotives of the United States
Railway locomotives introduced in 1972
Freight locomotives
Standard gauge locomotives of the United States